Piketown is an area in West Hanover Township, Dauphin County, Pennsylvania, United States, located near Fort Indiantown Gap.

References

Harrisburg–Carlisle metropolitan statistical area
Unincorporated communities in Dauphin County, Pennsylvania
Unincorporated communities in Pennsylvania